Pierre Boisson (born 8 June 1930) is a Monegasque former sports shooter. He competed at the 1972, 1976 and the 1984 Summer Olympics.

References

External links

1930 births
Possibly living people
Monegasque male sport shooters
Olympic shooters of Monaco
Shooters at the 1972 Summer Olympics
Shooters at the 1976 Summer Olympics
Shooters at the 1984 Summer Olympics
Place of birth missing (living people)